William Wallace Bunten (April 5, 1930 – February 29, 2020) was an American politician from Kansas. He served as mayor of Topeka, Kansas, having been elected to a four-year term in 2005 and re-elected in 2009. Before being elected mayor, he served in the Kansas House of Representatives from 1963 to 1991 and in the Kansas Senate from 2003 to 2004. He previously ran for mayor in 2001 and in a special election in 2003. To date, Bunten is the last member of the Republican Party to serve as Topeka mayor.

Bunten was the first mayor to be elected in Topeka under the new council-manager government, which stripped most of the powers of the office of mayor. Instead, the city council and appointed city manager held most of the power. As such, Bunten's role was limited to leading city council meetings, promoting economic development, and being the "ceremonial head" of the city. He replaced James McClinton as mayor, who did not seek a second term after the powers of the office were reduced.

A native Topekan, Bunten was a basketball player while attending Topeka High School. He was a teammate and good friend of Dean Smith, who later went on to fame as a basketball coach at North Carolina. Bunten and Smith both attended the University of Kansas and were members of Phi Gamma Delta social fraternity.  After college Bunten entered the US Marine Corps and served in Korea, rising to the rank of captain.

In 2010, Bunten decided to change the name of Topeka to Google in honor of the company Google, Inc. for one day. This was considered a ploy to attract Google to Topeka as a site for a high speed Internet installation. The site eventually was located in Kansas City, Kansas.

Bunten led an effort to improve the downtown area and promoted a plan to raise funds for the development of the area.

In 2012, Bill Bunten announced that he would not seek re-election in April 2013 at a City Council meeting.

He died of complications of pneumonia on February 29, 2020.

References

External links 
 Mayor website 
 
 Mayor looks to repeal law making snowball throwing a crime by the Associated Press
 Bunten seeks picket resolution by Tim Hrenchir of The Capital-Journal, July 2006

|-

|-

|-

2020 deaths
1930 births
Republican Party Kansas state senators
Republican Party members of the Kansas House of Representatives
Mayors of Topeka, Kansas
Military personnel from Kansas
University of Kansas alumni
20th-century American politicians
United States Marine Corps personnel of the Korean War
Deaths from pneumonia in Kansas
21st-century American politicians